Blakely is a city and the county seat of Early County, Georgia, United States. As of the 2010 census, it had a population of 5,068. It is located approximately halfway between Columbus and Tallahassee, Florida on U.S. Route 27.

History
Blakely was platted in 1825 as the county seat for Early County. It was named for Johnston Blakeley, an officer in the War of 1812. Between 1881 and 1947 at least seven African-Americans were lynched in Blakely, including at least two veterans. One of these, Wilbur Little, was murdered upon returning from service in World War I by whites who detested seeing a negro in uniform. In 1960 an African-American veteran from New Jersey who was traveling through the county was convicted of rape and sentenced to death 3 days after his arrest in a trial that featured no defense counsel and no jury. The story was chronicled in the movie Fair Game.A month after the article appeared in the Chicago Defender the NAACP sent Monroe N. Work to Blakely to investigate the incident. On June 7, 1919, Work sent a telegram to NAACP officer J.R. Shillady stating "Have investigated report. Blakely, Georgia, lynching does not appear to have ." Work concluded his investigation by recommending that allegations of a lynching be dropped. However, further review by the organization found that it had in fact occurred.

Geography
Blakely is located at  (31.376728, -84.933873). The city is located in southwestern Georgia along U.S. Route 27, Georgia State Route 62, and Georgia State Route 39.

Demographics

2020 census

As of the 2020 United States census, there were 5,371 people, 1,584 households, and 1,065 families residing in the city.

2000 census
As of the census of 2000, there were 5,696 people, 2,060 households, and 1,413 families residing in this town. The racial makeup of the city was 38.34% White, 59.97% African American, 0.19% Native American, 0.32% Asian, 0.12% Pacific Islander, 0.40% from other races, and 0.65% from two or more races. Hispanic or Latino of any race were 1.54% of the population.

There were 2,060 households, out of which 34.5% had children under the age of 18 living with them, 35.5% were married couples living together, 29.2% had a female householder with no husband present, and 31.4% were non-families. 28.0% of all households were made up of individuals, and 13.8% had someone living alone who was 65 years of age or older.  The average household size was 2.64 and the average family size was 3.25.

In the city, the population was spread out, with 31.9% under the age of 18, 8.1% from 18 to 24, 24.7% from 25 to 44, 18.8% from 45 to 64, and 16.5% who were 65 years of age or older.  The median age was 34 years. For every 100 females, there were 81.2 males.  For every 100 females age 18 and over, there were 71.2 males.

The median income for a household in the city was $20,250, and the median income for a family was $24,107. Males had a median income of $24,861 versus $16,116 for females. The per capita income for the city was $12,012,922.  About 29.6% of families and 33.6% of the population were below the poverty line, including 50.7% of those under age 18 and 22.7% of those age 65 or over.

Other
The Peanut Corporation of America had a factory in Blakely that produced peanut paste (which is in turn used by other manufacturers in other foods).  FBI and FDA officials said the plant's officials and workers were suspected of spreading salmonella bacteria in 2007-2009 by knowingly allowing products that had tested positive to be re-tested as negatives (giving a false-negative second result) and then allowing them to be shipped out despite the fact they could have been positive. This likely contributed to numerous illnesses and at least eight deaths. As a result, the FDA and FBI became involved, leading a U.S. Justice Department criminal investigation. Several lawsuits were filed by victims' relatives, and a massive nationwide recall of many products took place. The company shut the plant and laid off all of the plant's roughly 50 employees for the duration of the investigation, which caused economic hardship for the town during the 2009 recession.

The non-profit group Early County 2055 established its headquarters on Court Square in Blakely. Funding for the long-term development plan for the revitalization of the city and county was led by the Charles Rice Family and Foundation.

Blakely is the base of the Early County School System, which has a newly renovated football stadium and gymnasium. Blakely also opened a new sportsplex, named in memorial and honor of local coach Ray Knight. It has multiple softball,  baseball, and multi-purpose fields, and is operated by the Blakely-Early County Recreation Department.

Education

Early County School District 
The Early County School District holds grades pre-school to grade twelve, and consists of one elementary school, a middle school, and a high school. The district has 156 full-time teachers and over 2,764 students.
Early County Elementary School
Early County Middle School
Early County High School

Alternative School 
Learning and Opportunity Academy

Notable people 
Wilbur Little, lynching victim.

Kyle Riley: Mixed Martial Arts Fighter/ Boxer, NFC

Shawn Williams: Football, University of Georgia, NFL

Tay Cody: Football, Florida State University, NFL

Kyle Davis: Basketball, Auburn University

References

External links
 City of Blakely

Cities in Georgia (U.S. state)
Cities in Early County, Georgia
County seats in Georgia (U.S. state)